10 Serpentis is a single, white-hued star in Serpens Caput, the western section of the equatorial constellation of Serpens. It is faintly visible to the naked eye with an apparent visual magnitude of 5.15.

Abt and Morrell (1995) gave this star a stellar classification of A6 III, matching an evolved red giant star that has used up its core hydrogen. In contrast, Houk and Swift (1999) classed it A7 IV, which is more in line with an evolving subgiant star that is on its way to becoming a giant. It has a high rate of spin with a projected rotational velocity of 115 km/s, giving it an oblate shape with an equatorial bulge that is an estimated 7% larger than the polar radius. The star is about 424 million years old with 1.64 times the mass of the Sun and is radiating 12 times the Sun's luminosity from its photosphere at an effective temperature of roughly 7,872 K.

References

A-type giants
Serpens (constellation)
Durchmusterung objects
Serpentis, 10
137898
075761
5746